The 2014–15 Biathlon World Cup – World Cup 6 was held in Rasen-Antholz, Italy, from 22 January until 25 January 2015.

Schedule of events

Medal winners

Men

Women

Achievements
 Best performance for all time

 , 53rd place in Sprint
 , 61st place in Sprint
 , 63rd place in Sprint
 , 68th place in Sprint
 , 3rd place in Sprint
 , 4th place in Sprint
 , 13th place in Sprint
 , 30th place in Pursuit
 , 33rd place in Sprint
 , 35th place in Sprint

 First World Cup race

 , 88th place in Sprint
 , 94th place in Sprint

References 

6
2015 in Italian sport
January 2015 sports events in Italy
World Cup – World Cup 6